Paweł Bochniewicz (born 30 January 1996) is a Polish professional footballer who plays as a centre-back for Eredivisie club Heerenveen.

Club career
Bochniewicz started his career in his hometown club, Wisłoka Dębica. In 2010, he joined the youth team of Stal Mielec. Two years later his talent was spotted by Reggina Calcio scouts and he moved to Italy. On 22 March 2014, he made his senior debut in Serie B, coming on as a substitute in the 66th minute against Empoli.

On 6 June 2014, he joined Serie A club Udinese.

On 20 January 2018, Bochniewicz joined Ekstraklasa club Górnik Zabrze on loan. In July 2019, he signed for them on a permanent basis.

On 10 September 2020, Bochniewicz joined Eredivisie club Heerenveen on a three-year deal. He started in the first match of the season on 12 September 2020, in which he also scored in a 2–0 victory.

International career 
On 7 October 2020, Bochniewicz made his international debut in the friendly match against Finland and was replaced by Sebastian Walukiewicz.

References

External links
 
 

1996 births
Living people
People from Dębica
Sportspeople from Podkarpackie Voivodeship
Association football defenders
Polish footballers
Polish expatriate footballers
Poland youth international footballers
Poland under-21 international footballers
Poland international footballers
Reggina 1914 players
Udinese Calcio players
Club Recreativo Granada players
Górnik Zabrze players
SC Heerenveen players
Ekstraklasa players
Serie B players
Segunda División B players
Eredivisie players
Expatriate footballers in Italy
Expatriate footballers in Spain
Expatriate footballers in the Netherlands
Polish expatriate sportspeople in Italy
Polish expatriate sportspeople in Spain
Polish expatriate sportspeople in the Netherlands